The Pandi (or Pandae) in Medieval bestiaries and Greco-Roman geographic works were a race of giant-eared people with eight fingers and toes and white hair that turned black with age. In his Indica, the historian Ctesias located them in the mountains of India; he describes them as a warlike race of bowmen and spearmen and claims that they are born with a full set of teeth. Pliny the Elder, in his Natural History, adds that they live for two hundred years.

See also
 Panotti
 Macrobians

References 

Legendary tribes in Greco-Roman historiography